The  is a regional railway line in Shiga Prefecture operated by Ohmi Railway. 

The line is 9.3 km long, connecting Yōkaichi on the Main Line in Higashiōmi to Ōmi-Hachiman on the JR West Biwako Line in Omihachiman.

In addition to local shuttle trains, the Yōkaichi Line trains include Rapid Service that connects Yōkaichi and Ōmi-Hachiman nonstop, and through trains to the Main Line to Maibara or Kibukawa.

History
The Hunan Railway Co. opened the line in 1913, and merged with the Ohmi Railway Co. in 1944.

The line was electrified at 1500 VDC in 1946.

Former connecting lines
 Shin-Yōkaichi station - A 3km line to the Misono airfield operated between 1930 and 1948.

Stations
Rapid Service: + = stop; - = pass;
Local trains make all stops

See also
 List of railway lines in Japan

References
This article incorporates material from the corresponding article in the Japanese Wikipedia

Rail transport in Shiga Prefecture
Railway lines in Japan
Ohmi Railway